Judo at the Friendship Games was held at the Military University of Technology sports hall in Warsaw, Poland between 24 and 26 August 1984. Judokas contested in eight events (all men's) – seven weight classes and one open category.

Medal summary

Medal table

See also
 Judo at the 1984 Summer Olympics

References

Friendship Games
Friendship Games
Friendship Games
Judo competitions in Poland
1984 in Polish sport